Spilarctia metaxantha is a moth in the family Erebidae. It was described by George Hampson in 1901. It is found in Myanmar.

References

 

Moths described in 1901
metaxantha